Douglas MacDonald (1900–1996) was a farmer, miner and political figure in Nova Scotia, Canada. He represented Cape Breton Centre in the Nova Scotia House of Assembly from 1939 to 1945 as a Co-operative Commonwealth Federation member.

He was born in Georgetown, Prince Edward Island, the son of Archibald MacDonald and Annie MacKinnon. MacDonald married Lillian McLellan. He served in the artillery during World War I. He was president of the local chapter of the United Mine Workers of America. MacDonald won the first seat for the CCF in the Nova Scotia legislature in 1939; he was elected in a by-election held after Michael Dwyer resigned his seat.

References
 A Directory of the Members of the Legislative Assembly of Nova Scotia, 1758-1958, Public Archives of Nova Scotia (1958)

1900 births
1996 deaths
People from Kings County, Prince Edward Island
Nova Scotia New Democratic Party MLAs
Nova Scotia Co-operative Commonwealth Federation MLAs
20th-century Canadian politicians